Pan Glacier is a glacier 7 nautical miles (13 km) long, flowing north and terminating at the east coast of Antarctic Peninsula 2 nautical miles (3.7 km) southwest of Victory Nunatak. The lower part of the glacier was plotted by W.L.G. Joerg from air photos taken by Lincoln Ellsworth in November 1935. The glacier was subsequently photographed by Ronne Antarctic Research Expedition (RARE) (Trimetrogon air photography) in December 1947, and roughly surveyed by Falkland Islands Dependencies Survey (FIDS) in December 1958. Named by United Kingdom Antarctic Place-Names Committee (UK-APC) after Pan, god of the shepherds in Greek mythology.

Glaciers of Graham Land
Bowman Coast